The 2018 Lotto-Belisol Belgium Tour  is the sixth edition of the Lotto-Belisol Belgium Tour, previous called Lotto-Decca Tour, a women's cycle stage race in Belgium. The tour has an UCI rating of 2.1.

Stages

Classification leadership

See also

2018 in women's road cycling

References

External links

Lotto-Belisol Belgium Tour
Lotto-Belisol Belgium Tour
Lotto-Decca Tour